Kaluk is a rural locality (a selo) in Akhtynsky District, Republic of Dagestan, Russia. The population was 1,240 as of 2012. There are 3 streets.

Geography
Kaluk is located 9 km west of Akhty (the district's administrative centre) by road. Lutkun is the nearest rural locality.

References 

Rural localities in Akhtynsky District